The Hydrographer of the Navy is the principal hydrographical Royal Naval appointment. From 1795 until 2001, the post was responsible for the production of charts for the Royal Navy, and around this post grew the United Kingdom Hydrographic Office (UKHO).

In 2001, the post was disassociated from UKHO, and the Hydrographer of the Navy is now a title bestowed upon the current captain—hydrography and meteorology—on the staff of the Devonport Flotilla at HMNB Devonport.

History
Before the establishment of the post, captains of Royal Navy ships were responsible for the provision of their own charts. In practice this meant that ships often sailed with inadequate information for safe navigation, and that when new areas were surveyed, the data rarely reached all those who needed it. The Admiralty appointed Alexander Dalrymple as hydrographer on 12 August 1795, with a remit to gather and distribute charts to HM Ships. Within a year existing charts had been collated, and the first catalogue published. It was five years before the first chart—of Quiberon Bay in Brittany—was produced by the Hydrographer.

Under Dalrymple's successor, Captain Thomas Hurd, Admiralty charts were sold to the general public, and by 1825, there were 736 charts listed in the catalogue. In 1829, the first Sailing Directions were published, and in 1833, under Rear-Admiral Sir Francis Beaufort—of the eponymous Beaufort scale—the tide tables were first published. Notices to Mariners came out in 1834, allowing for the timely correction of charts already in use. Beaufort was certainly responsible for a step change in output; by the time he left the office in 1855, the Hydrographic Office had a catalogue of nearly 2,000 charts and was producing over 130,000 charts, of which about half were provided to the Royal Navy and half sold.

In 1939, on the outbreak of World War II, the Hydrographic Office moved to Taunton, and the post of hydrographer moved with it. In 2001, a chief executive was appointed to run the United Kingdom Hydrographic Office as a profit-making agency of the British government, and at this time the roles of National Hydrographer and Hydrographer of the Navy were divided. The title of hydrographer devolved to Captain (hydrography and meteorology), a senior officer on the staff of the Commodore of the Devonport Flotilla, and the senior Royal Navy officer within the HM branch. , the post has been renamed Captain (HM Ops), but continues to carry the title Hydrographer of the Navy.

List of hydrographers 

 1795–1808: Alexander Dalrymple 
 1808–1823: Captain Thomas Hurd
 1823–1829: Rear Admiral Sir Edward Parry 
 1829–1855: Rear Admiral Sir Francis Beaufort 
 1855–1863: Rear Admiral John Washington 
 1863–1874: Vice Admiral Sir George Richards 
 1874–1884: Captain Sir Frederick Evans 
 1884–1904: Rear Admiral Sir William Wharton 
 1904–1909: Rear Admiral Sir Arthur Mostyn Field 
 1909–1914: Rear Admiral Sir Herbert Purey-Cust
 1914–1919: Rear Admiral Sir John Parry
 1919–1924: Vice Admiral Sir Frederick Learmonth
 1924–1932: Vice Admiral Sir Percy Douglas 
 1932–1945: Vice Admiral Sir John Edgell
 1945–1950: Rear Admiral Arthur Norris Wyatt
 1950–1955: Vice Admiral Sir Archibald Day
 1955–1960: Rear Admiral Kenneth Collins
 1960–1966: Rear Admiral Sir Edmund Irving 
 1966–1971: Rear Admiral Steve Ritchie 
 1971–1975: Rear Admiral Geoffrey Hall
 1975–1985: Rear Admiral Sir David Haslam 
 1985–1990: Rear Admiral Roger Morris
 1990–1994: Rear Admiral John Myres
 1994–1996: Rear Admiral Sir Nigel Essenhigh 
 1996–2001: Rear Admiral John Clarke
 2001–2003: Captain Mike Barritt
 2003–2005: Captain David Lye
 2005–2007: Captain Ian Turner
 2007–2010: Captain Robert Stewart
 2010–2012: Captain Vaughan Nail
 2012–2013: Captain Stephen Malcolm
 2013–2016: Captain David Robertson
 2016–2017: Captain Matt Syrett
 2017–2019: Captain Gary Hesling
 2019–2021: Captain Derek Rae
 2021–2023: Commander Mathew J Warren

Notes

References

External links 
 

 

 
Hydrography
National hydrographic offices
Royal Navy appointments